Virendra Singh may refer to:
Virendra Singh (actor) a Hindi Television actor of 1990's 
Virendra Singh (physicist) (born 1938), Indian theoretical physicist
Virendra Singh (Lokayukta) (born 1949), lokayukta of Uttar Pradesh, India
Virendra Singh (Bhadohi) (born 1956), Lok Sabha member for Bhadohi, India
Virendra Singh (politician) (born 1959), member of the Sixteenth Legislative Assembly of Uttar Pradesh in India
Virendra Singh (Mirzapur), Lok Sabha member for Mirzapur, India
Virendra Kumar Singh (born 1953), Indian politician